Colón Island (Spanish: Isla Colón) is the northernmost and main island in the Bocas del Toro Archipelago located in Bocas del Toro Province, Panama. The capital city of the province, Bocas del Toro, is located on the island and is one of Panama's main tourist attractions with over 150,000 visitors per year and an 8% annual rate of growth in tourism.

The island
Beachfront hotels, restaurants, night clubs, discothèques and residential districts are prominent on Colón Island.

Beaches: Itsmito Beach, also known as La Feria, Big Creek, Bluff, Mimitibi, Bocas del Drago, Starfish.
Important locations: Main Park, Governor's Building, Hotel Bahia, Airport, Hospital, Cemetery, La Feria, Bluff, La Gruta bat cave, Bocas del Drago.

Transportation
The island has a strong boating community. Access to the other nearby islands in the archipelago requires either a private boat or rental of a water taxi.

By air, the island can be reached from Panama City via Air Panama.

From Almirante you may take a ferry or water taxi service.

The island has several marinas available for international boaters.

Local taxi service is provided mainly by yellow pickup trucks with 1T- followed by a number on the doors, and by 15 passenger mini-buses marked as Transporte Colectivo.

Image Gallery

Climate
Under the Köppen climate classification, Colon Island has a tropical wet climate.

See also
List of islands of Panama

References

 

Caribbean islands of Panama